Tak Mar is a village in Sheshtaraz Rural District, Sheshtaraz District, Khalilabad County, Razavi Khorasan Province, Iran. At the 2006 census, its population was 635, in 167 families.

References 

Populated places in Khalilabad County